RECORD TV is a channel of RecordTV in Cape Verde. It is the first Brazilian based channel to have its own version in Cape Verde.  The network was launched on 31 March 2007.

Its station is in the west of the city in the northern part of Cidadela in Praia and located off the road linking with Ribeira Grande and Porto Mosquito and the Circular Road. Nearly a kilometer west is the Jean Piaget University of Cape Verde.

The network may have now recently broadcasting sports programs from Cape Verde apart from football (soccer).

The network first broadcast the 2011 federal elections, the parliamentary and the presidential.

Programming
Balanço Geral
CV no Ar
Eco Musical 
Ponto de Vista (Point of View)
Fala Cabo Verde
Record Shopping
Tudo a Ver (ALl for To)
Contacto Directo (Direct Contact, also known as Contato Direito)
Pikinotes Sabe Tcheu

Fala Cabo Verde
Its own version equivalent to Fala Brasil is titled Fala Cabo Verde. The Capeverdean version of the news program is the main news broadcast. It is aired Weeknights (Monday to Friday) at 19h30. It is reported by Silvana Gomes and coordinated by Elisabete Dias.

Eco Musical
Edneia Barros presents the daily format of the Cape Verdean version of Eco Musical. It shows exclusive interviews of main celebrities in Capeverdean Music and highlights of what happens in showbiz.

The songs are aired on Eco Top with the best music videos which is part of the multicultural program.

Coverage
With national coverage in open signal, Record TV Cabo Verde transmits in the city of Praia and other islands of the archipelago. It serves up to 89% of the population and about 75–80% of the area of the nation. Signals goes as far into the ocean up to around 50 km distant as it is heard on several ferry boats, but not merchant ships. Here are a list of signals that currently cover in Cape Verde:

Up to 2014, analogue signals into Santo Antão were aired from Mindelo on channel 32. Sal had a single analogue signal. From Monte Verde's towers, Santa Luzia, the islets of Raso and Branco and the shoreline areas of São Nicolau receives transmitters to the areas, the east of São Nicolau receives its signals from Monte Curral near Espargos as the island has a transmitter but does not broadcasts Record Cabo Verde. West Fogo's analog signal spreads into northeast Brava and the northern islets. The rest of the island has its own signal at Nossa Senhora do Monte, first at channel 21, changed to channel 24.

Boa Vista remains an island without its own signal, its broadcasts are from nearby Santa Maria.  Tarrafal de Monte Trigo has no signals received there, Topo da Coroa has no single transmitter located in the vicinity. While due to its high elevation, Chã das Caldeiras and area does not receive signals.

Recently digital signals has been put which is on channel 2, currently airing in the islands of São VIcente, Sal and Santiago. Record Cabo Verde and other Capeverdean channels may have a plan that will have all their signals in digital format as to many other countries including Europe, Asia, the Americas and most of Australasia.

A likely probability is that Record Cabo Verde is now available on satellite television.

References

External links
Official website 

Television stations in Cape Verde
Portuguese-language television networks
RecordTV affiliates
Television channels and stations established in 2007
Mass media in Praia
2007 establishments in Cape Verde